Whitehall is a town in Jefferson County, Montana, United States. The population was 1,006 at the 2020 census. It is part of the Helena Micropolitan Statistical Area.

The town is nestled in the Jefferson Valley, which is shadowed by the Tobacco Root and Highland Mountain ranges and sits in the heart of the Deerlodge National Forest. It is also within 23–60 miles of three major airports, four colleges, five ski resorts, seven major rivers, mountain lakes for fishing and backpacking, four lakes for boating, and three hot springs. There are numerous snowmobiling trails for winter riding and summer trail rides. The mountain ranges surrounding the valley, provide excellent opportunity for hunting big game.

Whitehall's local attractions include Lewis and Clark Caverns State Park, Jefferson River, Ringing Rocks, and the Jefferson Valley Museum.

History
Whitehall began as a rail depot created by the Northern Pacific and Montana Railroad on September 25, 1889. The name for the depot came from E.G. Brooke, who was inspired by a similar town in which he stayed in Illinois while making his way westward. On September 3, 1890, the Jefferson County Commissioners accepted and filed the Townsite of Whitehall.

Geography
Whitehall is located at  (45.870238, -112.098464). Interstate 90 passes by the town with access via exit 249.

Climate
According to the Köppen Climate Classification system, Whitehall has a semi-arid climate, abbreviated "BSk" on climate maps.

Demographics

2010 census
As of the census of 2010, there were 1,038 people, 473 households, and 283 families residing in the town. The racial makeup of the town was 94.0% White, 0.2% African American, 1.7% Native American, 0.5% Asian, 0.1% from other races, and 3.5% from two or more races. Hispanic or Latino of any race were 2.0% of the population.

There were 473 households, of which 26.8% had children under the age of 18 living with them, 44.4% were married couples living together, 9.7% had a female householder with no husband present, 5.7% had a male householder with no wife present, and 40.2% were non-families. 35.3% of all households were made up of individuals, and 15.9% had someone living alone who was 65 years of age or older. The average household size was 2.19 and the average family size was 2.84.

The median age in the town was 45.7 years. 23% of residents were under the age of 18; 7% were between the ages of 18 and 24; 19.6% were from 25 to 44; 33% were from 45 to 64; and 17.4% were 65 years of age or older. The gender makeup of the town was 51.9% male and 48.1% female.

2000 census
As of the census of 2000, there were 1,044 people, 450 households, and 297 families residing in the town. The population density was 1,527.3 people per square mile (592.8/km2). There were 507 housing units at an average density of 741.7 per square mile (287.9/km2). The racial makeup of the town was 94.54% White, 2.49% Native American, 0.29% Asian, 0.10% Pacific Islander, 0.10% from other races, and 2.49% from two or more races. Hispanic or Latino of any race were 1.72% of the population.

There were 450 households, out of which 27.3% had children under the age of 18 living with them, 54.2% were married couples living together, 9.3% had a female householder with no husband present, and 34.0% were non-families. 29.8% of all households were made up of individuals, and 15.3% had someone living alone who was 65 years of age or older. The average household size was 2.32 and the average family size was 2.86.

In the town, the population was spread out, with 25.2% under the age of 18, 5.7% from 18 to 24, 25.3% from 25 to 44, 23.9% from 45 to 64, and 20.0% who were 65 years of age or older. The median age was 41 years. For every 100 females, there were 93.3 males. For every 100 females age 18 and over, there were 86.0 males.

The median income for a household in the town was $29,940, and the median income for a family was $38,833. Males had a median income of $30,682 versus $19,643 for females. The per capita income for the town was $15,527. About 8.8% of families and 12.0% of the population were below the poverty line, including 15.7% of those under age 18 and 7.6% of those age 65 or over.

Education
Public education in the town of Whitehall is provided by Whitehall School District. The district includes Whitehall Elementary School (grades K-6), Whitehall Middle School (grades 7-8), and Whitehall High School (grades 9-12). They are a Class B school (108-306 students) which helps determine athletic competitions..

Whitehall's mascot is the Trojans, with school colors of purple and gold. 

Whitehall Community Library is a public library which serves the town.

Notable people

 Sam Adams (1963– ), former mayor of Portland, Oregon.
 Chet Huntley (1911–1974), broadcaster, graduated from Whitehall High School.
 Rob "Robbie" Johnson (b. 1983), Major League Baseball player, played Little League in Whitehall.
 Bill Pullman (b. 1953), actor, has a ranch near town and lives there part-time.

References

External links

 Jefferson Valley Museum
 Whitehall Ledger
 Whitehall Chamber of Commerce
 Whitehall Rotary Club

Towns in Jefferson County, Montana
Helena, Montana micropolitan area